Gadahara (Brahmi:  Ga-ḍa-ha-ra), sometimes Gadakhara (Brahmi:  Ga-ḍa-kha-ra), is a name appearing on numerous coins at the end of the Kushan Empire or the beginning of the rule of the Kidarite Huns in the area of Central and Western Punjab in India, in the period circa 350-375 CE. 

The name  Ga-ḍa-ha-ra appears vertically as a monogram in the right field of the coins. Then several name appear under the arm of the ruler, including Yasada, Piroz, Kirada and Samudragupta.

It is not known with certainty whether Gadahara is actually the name of a ruler, or a clan, or a geographical region, although modern scholarship considers it is indeed the region of Gandhara.

The appearance of the names of foreign rulers such as the Kushano-Sassanian Piroz ( Pi-ro-ysa) or the Gupta Empire Samudragupta ( Samudra) may suggest some kind of suzerainty at a time when the remnants of Kushan power were torn between these two powers.

The Gadahara coins may be the last of the Kushan coins before the invasion of the Kidarites. But it is often thought that these coin actually were issued by the Kidarites themselves, who were invading the Kushan realm around that time, although they seem to come chronologically just before the issues of the famous Kidarite ruler Kidara.

Other coin issues of Gadahara

References

Kushan Empire